H-Bio  is an oil-refining processes which involves converting vegetable oil into high-quality diesel via hydrogenation. Hydrogenation is a chemical reaction, in which a substance is treated with Hydrogen, thus resulting in a new product. In H-Bio, Hydrogen is added to vegetable oil and mineral oil, making a usable diesel that is made up of diesel oil and 10% vegetable oil. The process was first developed in 2006 by the Brazilian, state-owned and gas company, Petrobras, and was primarily established for commercial use.

H-Bio can be used to power many cars that already use diesel, therefore, H-Bio can be widely sold to car owners in local fuel stations. Moreover, the process has many advantages when compared to traditional methods, but also has drawbacks. H-Bio has been tested and confirmed as a viable method to supply diesel globally.

Process
The procedure requires that the diesel pass through the Hydrodesulfurization Chamber, the Cracking Unit, and mix with HDS Light Cycle Oil. The Hydrodesulfurization Chamber removes the majority of the Sulfur content found in the diesel. The Cracking Unit breaks up the hydrocarbons, and then H-Bio is mixed with great amounts of poor diesel fuel. The process consists of:

Hydrodesulfurization
Diesel first passes through the distillation unit to undergo hydrodesulfurization (HDS). Hydrodesulfurization is the process of removing sulfur from petroleum-based products by chemically combining it with hydrogen, resulting in hydrogen sulfide. Hydrogen and sulfur are combined in a hydrodesulfurization reactor, usually under the presence of a metal catalyst, where pressure is added to the bond and it is heated in temperatures ranging from 300° to 400° Celsius (572° to 752° Fahrenheit), resulting in Hydrogen Sulfide molecules that are not included in the diesel.

Cracking Unit
The diesel is then passed through the Cracking Unit. The Cracking Unit is a device that breaks up the hydrocarbons, that make up the diesel, into smaller sizes. Companies break up the hydrocarbons so that they make the most petroleum-based products, with the amount of supply they  have.

Mixing with HDS Light Cycle Oil 
Next, the diesel is mixed with HDS light cycle oil (LCO). The HDS light cycle oil is a poor diesel fuel due to its high sulfur content and poor engine ignition performance, thus it is mixed with H-Bio. The two are combined to produce the maximum amount of high-quality fuel possible, with the given amount of supply. When HDS Light Cycle Oil and H-Bio are blended, the fluid viscosity is modified for maximum performance, resulting in high-quality diesel. The resulting diesel has great ignition performance with very little sulfur content.

Finally, the diesel is mixed with other components that do not require the hydrogenation process and this mixture results in H-Bio.

Application 
H-Bio can be easily implemented into society. H-Bio is compatible with any vehicle that already uses diesel as its main fuel source, in which no modifications to the engine or transmission are necessary. Additionally, H-Bio can be sold to consumers in local fuel stations, unlike its counterpart, biodiesel.

Pros 
H-Bio has many aspects that are very beneficial. Some advantages include car efficiency, diesel characteristics that enhance performance, and fewer green house emissions. The main advantages of the H-Bio are that:
 The process does not generate waste.
 No special efforts are needed to keep the diesel usable, such as separate storage.
 Cars that currently use diesel are already adapted to use H-Bio.
 The diesel has better ignition performance and a lower density.
  H-Bio is a higher-quality diesel with very little sulfur content, and therefore will release fewer sulfur dioxide molecules, a main component of acid rain, emissions in the atmosphere, thus not emitting as much greenhouse gases as traditional methods.
Drivers still retain the same miles per gallon(MPG).
 The Hydrogen used is recycled throughout the process.
 The vegetable oil used for the process can be from various sources, which means that obtaining the appropriate vegetable oils for the process is easier, thus opening up more options for the consumer and the corporation. Having various options in production input can lead to a flexibility in choices like, diesel pricing and quality.

Cons 
H-Bio also has drawbacks, which include the high production costs and green house gases emitted when the diesel is burned. 
The high cost of the procedure has created setbacks in production. Petrobras has currently stopped production, until production costs go down, due to the fact that one barrel of diesel, produced from soy oil, costs $180. The production costs of producing one barrel of regular diesel only costs $104.
 Another major con is the release of some greenhouse gasses. Although this type of diesel realizes fewer sulfur compounds into the atmosphere, other potent greenhouse gases are released, such as carbon dioxide and water vapor, which lead to gaps in the atmosphere. In the exhaust of a diesel engine, 2%-12% of emissions are carbon dioxide concentrations, and another 2%-12% are water vapor concentration.

Future outlook 
H-Bio has achieved industrial testing that uses soybean oil to produce diesel. The results proved that the process is more than capable of being mass-produced and implemented into society. The short-term goal is to create two refineries and eventually expand to five refineries in the long term. Next, the company will test this process, with different types of vegetable oils, in other refineries, and lastly, they will analyze the results.

References

External links 
 http://www.petrobras.com.br/pt/

Biofuels